Nicolas Lemaigre (born August 23, 1980 in Tonnerre) is a French football (soccer), who currently plays for AJ Auxerre.

References 

1980 births
Living people
French footballers
AJ Auxerre players
Association football forwards
Association football defenders